Aralia chinensis, a plant scientific name, may refer to:

Aralia chinensis 
Aralia chinensis , a synonym of Aralia dasyphylla

References